Dorff is a surname, and may refer to:

 Daniel Dorff, American composer
 Elliot N. Dorff, American rabbi
 Eugene Dorff, American politician
 , a German botanist and phycologist using the author abbreviation Dorff
 Stephen Dorff (born 1973), American actor